David John Black (born 2 October 1952) is a male retired British long-distance runner. Black competed in the marathon at the 1980 Summer Olympics. He represented England and won a silver medal in the 10,000 metres and a bronze medal in the 5,000 metres, at the 1974 British Commonwealth Games in Christchurch, New Zealand. Four years later he represented England in the 10,000 metres, at the 1978 Commonwealth Games in Edmonton, Alberta, Canada.

References

1952 births
Living people
Athletes (track and field) at the 1974 British Commonwealth Games
Athletes (track and field) at the 1976 Summer Olympics
Athletes (track and field) at the 1978 Commonwealth Games
Athletes (track and field) at the 1980 Summer Olympics
British male long-distance runners
British male marathon runners
Olympic athletes of Great Britain
Sportspeople from Tamworth, Staffordshire
Commonwealth Games medallists in athletics
Commonwealth Games silver medallists for England
Commonwealth Games bronze medallists for England
Medallists at the 1974 British Commonwealth Games